The 2008 World Sprint Speed Skating Championships were held in the Thialf arena in Heerenveen, Netherlands, on 19 and 20 January 2008. They were the 37th World Championships.

Men 

DQ = disqualifiedNS = Not started

Source: ISU

Women 

DQ = disqualifiedNS = Not started

Source: ISU

Rules 
All participating skaters are allowed to skate all races.

References

2008 World Sprint
World Sprint Speed Skating Championships, 2008
World Sprint, 2008
World Sprint Speed Skating Championships, 2008
2008 in Dutch sport